Bell Telephone Exchange Building, also known as the Preston Telephone Exchange, is a historic telephone exchange located in the Powelton Village neighborhood of Philadelphia, Pennsylvania. It was built about 1900, by the Bell Telephone Company.  It is a three-story, five bay, brick building on a raised basement and once set within a set of rowhouses.  It is in the Georgian Revival style.  It features an arched entrance and decorative cornice above the second story. It was used as a telephone exchange until 1928.

It was added to the National Register of Historic Places in 2002.

References

Commercial buildings on the National Register of Historic Places in Philadelphia
Georgian Revival architecture in Pennsylvania
Infrastructure completed in 1900
Powelton Village, Philadelphia